Roosevelt High School (RHS) is a public secondary school located in the Roosevelt neighborhood of Seattle, Washington, United States. Opened in 1922 to relieve overcrowding at Lincoln High School, it ranks as the second-largest high school in Seattle Public Schools. NPR described RHS as "an above-average school in a below-average school district" based on test scores in 2001.

History

The school is named after President Theodore Roosevelt (1858–1919); the school's team, the Rough Riders, is named after Roosevelt's famous military regiment. It subsequently gave its name to the Roosevelt neighborhood and nearby Roosevelt Way Northeast.

The school was designed by the Seattle School District's architect, Floyd Naramore, and constructed in 1921–22. From 2004 to 2006, the building was seismically retrofitted, modernized, and expanded while many of the school's original architectural elements were preserved. During this time classes were held in Lincoln High School. Architects for this work were Bassetti Architects.

Programs, groups, and clubs

Roosevelt High School has the only full-time drama program in the Seattle School District.  Eight periods of drama are offered per day including directing, acting, technical theater, production, design, and a complete musical theater program. There are four private voice teachers, a vocal director, and a choreographer for the annual musical. Each year Roosevelt holds its "Dramafest" (a series of twelve student-produced plays), a Winter Production, and a Spring Musical.

In the Hands for a Bridge program, students choose to travel either to South Africa or Northern Ireland, where they help foster dialogue about diversity, prejudice, and social change. This group was created in 2001 by teachers Tom Nolet, Francene Watson, and Danny Rock with assistance from the University of Washington's Comparative History of Ideas Program and the Jackson School of International Studies. Each student accepted to this program is enrolled in the HFB class, where an intensive year-long study of literature, history, and the arts focuses on cultures in conflict. The Northern Ireland travelers visit Oakgrove Integrated College in Derry which is led by John Harkin, while the South African travelers visit Isilimela Comprehensive School and Bellville High School (Hoërskool Bellville) in Cape Town.

Roosevelt also is home to FIRST Robotics Competition (FRC) Washington team 4180, the Iron Riders. The student-run club constructs robots to compete in yearly competitions. The team attended the 2016 FIRST Championship in St. Louis and won a District Innovation in Control Award for their image recognition and targeting system. The Iron Riders were also on the winning alliance at the 8th Annual Washington Girls Generation FIRST Robotics Competition in 2019.

Music

Marching band
The marching band performs halftime shows at some home football games and basketball games.  Known as "The Pride of Seattle," this group of students also travels to and performs in multiple parades in the Northwest region each year.

Orchestras
The Roosevelt Orchestra program includes the Concert Orchestra, the Chamber Orchestra, and the Symphony Orchestra. The orchestras perform annually at various concerts and competitions, including the annual Northwest Orchestra Festival in Gresham, Oregon. In the 2013 festival, three groups out of the five (including a quintet and a sinfonia group) took first place in their divisions. The Roosevelt Symphony Orchestra also performs yearly with the Seattle Symphony in the annual Side by Side concert.

Jazz band
The Roosevelt Jazz Band performs and competes all over the nation, and it has traveled internationally. The band has been a finalist twenty-one times (more than any other band) in the Essentially Ellington Competition in New York City, receiving Honorable Mention in 2010 and 2018, and winning third place in 2000, second place in 2001, 2005, 2009, 2011, and 2012, and first place in 2002, 2007, 2008, and 2019.  Besides its renowned Jazz Band, Roosevelt has a vocal jazz group and multiple after-school jazz bands: Jazz Bands II, III, and IV. Jazz Band III was introduced at the beginning of the 2006–07 school year because of an increased number of jazz musicians arriving at Roosevelt. At the start of the 2016–2017 school year, a fourth jazz band was added due to an even greater amount of jazz musicians entering the program.

Concert bands
Besides the jazz bands and orchestras, student musicians have the option to be in one of two concert bands. Concert Band consists entirely of Freshmen, while older students can either be in the Symphonic Band, or the Wind Ensemble, which was created in the 2016–17 school year as a result of the expanding band program.

Sports

Roosevelt's teams are named the Roughriders. Roosevelt athletics traditionally participated in the Metro League since its opening until the 1997–98 school year when Roosevelt, Garfield and Franklin High Schools moved to the Kingco 4A conference. Ballard High School moved to Kingco 4A in 2000. In 2014–15, Roosevelt, Garfield and Ballard High schools returned to the Metro 3A Conference.

Basketball

The boys' basketball team has won three state championships: in 1946, 1973 & 1982 and placed 2nd in 1965 & 1987. The most recent state playoffs appearance occurred in 2009. The girls' basketball team has won one state championship and had a wide-release theatrical movie, The Heart of the Game, based on their experiences.

Golf

In 2016, the boys' golf team capped off an undefeated season with a metro, district, and state championship. The girls' golf team won the 2021 Metro League championship.

Football

The Rough Riders football team lays claim to one state championship, as crowned by the Associated Press in 1950. Since the start of the official state playoffs in 1974, Roosevelt has made it to the state playoffs five times, most recently advancing to the quarterfinals in 2012 and to Round of 16 in 2014.

Soccer

The boys' soccer team has been to the state playoffs fifteen times, placing 4th three times in 1985, 1990, & 2005; 3rd in 2013, and placing 1st in 2017. After finishing first in 2017, the boys' soccer team was ranked at the end of the year by MaxPreps as the 6th rated Boys Soccer team in the US.

The girls' soccer team has been to the state playoffs eleven times, placing 3rd in 1990, and 2nd in 2000. Notable players include Meghan Miller, who at Kansas was named 2004 NSCAA Second Team All American, and Wynne McIntosh, 1993 Metro League MVP, Parade All-American, Youth National Team member, and Portland Pilot. McIntosh played professionally in Frau Bundesliga, WUSA, and semi-professionally in W-League, WPSL. 3rd Team All-American, NCAA All-Tournament Team, WCC First Team.

Ultimate Frisbee

Organized as a club sport, the ultimate program at Roosevelt fields single-gender teams for boys and girls in both fall and spring, and coed teams during the winter and at tournaments. The boys team entered the national stage with impressive wins over Summit, Monarch, and Northwest to win the 2015 Westerns High School Ultimate tournament. They followed up with a 2nd-place finish at the 2015 Seattle Invite Tournament, once again defeating Northwest but losing to Franklin in the finals. At the 2016 Western High School Regional Championships, the boys placed first and the girls took 6th place. In the winter of 2016–2017, varsity and junior varsity teams began participating in the new mixed winter high school league offered by Disc Northwest.

Languages

Roosevelt offers Spanish and French, and it is the only school in Seattle Public Schools that offers American Sign Language. It used to offer Japanese and Latin and was the last Seattle Public Schools school to do so before the programs were cut due to lack of interest, though it is generally agreed that the problem was actually the funding.

Newspaper

The Roosevelt News is a National Pacemaker Award-winning paper produced monthly by students and overseen by a staff advisor.

Demographics

As of Fall 2016 the student demographics were:

 69% - Caucasian
 11.6% - Asian
 7.1% - Hispanic
 4.4% - African American/Black
 0.3% - American Indian/Alaska Native
 7.5% - Multiracial

Notable alumni

Alumni of Roosevelt High School include:
 Jason Andrews, co-founder of Andrews Space and CEO of Spaceflight Industries, Inc.
 Brittain Ashford, musician, Broadway actress
 Lynda Barry, cartoonist, author
 Linda Buck, Nobel Prize winner
 Charles Burns, cartoonist 
 Gordon Clinton, former Seattle Mayor
 Bo Cornell, former NFL linebacker and running back
 Chris Creighton, college football coach
 Howard Duff, actor
 James Edwards, former NBA player
 Daniel J. Evans, former U.S. Senator and Governor
 Lee Folkins, former NFL tight end
 Mary (Maxwell) Gates, mother of Microsoft founder Bill Gates
 Sara Gazarek, jazz singer
 Seth Gordon, director
 David Guterson, author (Snow Falling on Cedars, 1994, and East of the Mountains, 1999)
 Chris R. Hansen, hedge fund manager
 Jane Hamsher, producer, author, blogger 
Nevin Harrison, sprint canoe world champion and Olympic gold medalist 
 Eldon Hoke, musician (The Mentors)
 Paul Hess, former Kansas State Representative (1971–73) and Kansas State Senator (1973-1984)
 Ruth Jessen, former LPGA golfer
 Sebastian Jones, producer (Friends)
 Richard Karn, actor (Home Improvement)
 Chad Kimball, actor
 Thomas Kohnstamm, author (Do Travel Writers Go to Hell?, 2008, and Lake City, 2019)
 Ryan Lewis, musician, photographer, director, and DJ
 Henri Lubatti, actor
 Robert Lucas, Jr., Nobel Prize-winning economist
 Wing Luke, Assistant Attorney General of Washington, Seattle City Council member
 Betty MacDonald, author (The Egg and I)
Emma Marris, journalist and author
 T.J. Martin, Oscar-winning director
 Jim Matheos, musician (Fates Warning)
 Mike McCready, musician (Pearl Jam)
 Rose McGowan, actress and model
 Duff McKagan, musician (Guns N' Roses)
 Hugh Millen, former NFL quarterback
 Jonathan Moore, musician (Source of Labor)
 William Newman, actor (1952)
 Solea Pfeiffer, actress
 Mark Pattison, former NFL wide receiver
 Joe Rantz, rower and Olympic gold medalist
 Melissa Reese, musician and keyboardist for Guns N' Roses
 Merle Greene Robertson, Mayanist
 Sir Mix-a-lot, rapper, best known for Baby Got Back 
 Nikki Sixx, musician (Mötley Crüe)
 Tom Turnure, former NFL guard/center
 Marcus Williams, basketball player
 Claire Wilson, Washington State Senator
 James Whitney Young, astronomer (Jet Propulsion Laboratory)
 Rick May, voice and stage actor

References

External links

"Roosevelt High School: One Year in the Life", NPR radio article

High schools in King County, Washington
Seattle Public Schools
Public high schools in Washington (state)
Educational institutions established in 1922
1922 establishments in Washington (state)